Biscotti, known also as cantucci, are Italian almond biscuits that originated in the Tuscan city of Prato. They are twice-baked, oblong-shaped, dry, crunchy, and may be dipped in a drink, traditionally Vin Santo.

Name 
Cantuccio is an old Italian word that literally means "little place", "nook", or "corner" but that, in the past, was also used to indicate a little piece of bread with a lot of crust (usually the first and last slices of the loaf, the "corners").

The word biscotto, used in modern Italian to refer to a biscuit (or cookie) of any kind, originates from the medieval Latin word biscoctus, meaning "twice-cooked". It characterised oven-baked goods that were baked twice, so they became very dry and could be stored for long periods of time. Such non-perishable food was particularly useful during journeys and wars, and twice-baked breads were a staple food of the Roman legions.

The word biscotto, in this sense, shares its origin with the British-English (via Old French) word "biscuit", which refers to what American-English-speakers call a "cookie". In modern Italian, the word biscotto refers to any cookie or cracker, just as does the British use of the word "biscuit" (the number of bakings and the degree of hardness are not relevant to the term). In other countries, the term "biscotti", used as a singular, refers only to the specific Italian biscuit known in Italy as cantuccio.

History

Italy 

Although commonly used to indicate the biscuits of Prato, biscotti di Prato, in modern Italy and Argentina they are also known widely by the name "cantuccini". These names actually suggest other similar regional products of Italy. The term cantuccini is most commonly used today in Tuscany, but originally refers to variations or imitations which deviate from the traditional recipe in a few key points such as the use of yeasts, acids (to make them less dry) and flavourings. Rusks are larger, longer biscuits, rustic bread dough enriched with olive oil and anise seeds.

The confusion on the name may have been born from the fact that on the old sign (still present) of "Biscottificio Antonio Mattei," the leading manufacturer of biscuits of Prato, is written just below the name of the shop: "Manufacturers of cantuccini," which at the time were one of the major products of the biscuits. The sign has remained unchanged, and after such a long time people are accustomed to associate the name "cantuccini" with the biscuits typical of Sardinia and Sicily.

The rest of Europe 

The Old French word bescoit passed into the English language as "biscuit", although in English as in Italian "biscuit" does not refer specifically to a twice-baked biscuit.

In France, a similar biscuit is known as croquant.

In Spain and France, the Catalan carquinyoli (plural carquinyolis) is made with whole or sliced almonds and is also associated with several Catalan-speaking territories. In Batea, La Fatarella, and Prat de Comte, all inland municipalities of Catalonia, and in the Terra Alta, they are also called carquinyols.

Biscotti are traditional also in some inland towns in Valencia, where they are called rosegons or rosegós. In Menorca, carquinyols are square shaped and do not include whole almonds. One Catalan food writer states that carquinyoli is derived from the French croquignole. Croquignole, another name for these biscotti, is a French word of Germanic origin.

North America 
In North America, where "biscuit" has taken on other meanings, any twice-baked biscuits are likely to be known as biscotti.

Recipe 

Following rediscovery of the original recipe by Prato pastry chef Antonio Mattei in the nineteenth century, his variation is what is now accepted as the traditional recipe for biscotti. Mattei brought his cakes to the Exposition Universelle of Paris of 1867, winning a special mention.

The mixture is composed exclusively of flour, sugar, eggs, pine nuts, and almonds that are not roasted or skinned. The traditional recipe uses no form of yeast or fat (butter, oil, milk). The barely wet dough is then cooked twice: once in slab form, and again after cutting in sliced form, with the second baking defining how hard the biscotti are.

Traditionally in Italy, biscotti di Prato are sold together with another sweet speciality of Prato, the bruttiboni. Served after dessert, they are usually combined with orange juice.

Modern variations 

Today the regional variations of the original are still adhered to, but the modern mass-manufactured biscotti are in fact closer to cantuccini, variations of biscotti.

Modern biscotti recipes often contain nuts (traditional almonds, pine nuts, pistachios, and hazelnuts are popular choices) or spices such as anise or cinnamon.

Modern recipes include adding baking powder and spices to the flour. The nuts are then added to allow them to be coated, with the skins being left particularly when using almonds and hazelnuts. Separately, eggs are beaten together, and then any wet flavouring (e.g., almond extract or liquor), before being added to the dry ingredients. Following twice baking (once in long slab form, secondly in cut sliced form), the biscotti may be dipped in a glaze, such as chocolate.

Use 

Since they are very dry, biscotti traditionally are served with a drink, into which they may be dunked. In Italy they are typically served as an after-dinner dessert with a Tuscan fortified wine called vin santo.

Outside of Italy, they more frequently accompany coffee, including cappuccinos and lattes, or black tea.

In Catalonia, carquinyolis are usually served with a small glass of a sweet dessert wine, such as muscat or moscatell.

Culture 
In the Catalan city Vic, "Carquinyoli" is also the name of a ceremonial figure who orchestrates an annual summer festival in honor of the patron saint Albert of Sicily. In Vilanova i la Geltrú, biscotti with almonds are called currutacos and are most typically associated with Palm Sunday, when they are used to ornament the palm leaves that are distributed to worshipers.

Biscotti are much used as an ingredient in a variety of traditional dishes. In Catalonia, such dishes include rice with sardines and rabbit with snails. They are also used in sauces with onions (specifically calçots). In coastal Baix Llobregat, biscotti are used in the sauce for a dish of duck stuffed with turnips.

See also 

 Biscocho
 Biscuit
 Bizcocho
 Catalan cuisine
 Crouton
 Hardtack
 Ka'ak
 Mandelbrot (cookie)
 Pignolo (macaroon)
 Rusk
 Zwieback

References 
 Umberto Mannucci, Bisenzio tradizioni e cucina, Libreria del Palazzo, Prato, 1973.

Notes

External links 

 Recipes
 Cooking For Engineers: biscotti recipe
 Twice-Cooked Delights. Retrieved February 26, 2005.

Italian pastries
Catalan cuisine
Biscuits
Almond cookies
Twice-baked goods
Wine culture
Coffee culture
Cuisine of Tuscany
Italian products with protected designation of origin